Munster/Dyer Main Street is a planned South Shore Line rail station located at the foot of Main Street on the border Munster and Dyer, Indiana. The station will be constructed adjacent to the CSX Monon Subdivision, but will utilize new tracks. Intended to serve as the southern terminus of the West Lake Corridor, it is expected to open to revenue service in 2025.

References

South Shore Line stations in Indiana
Railway stations in Lake County, Indiana
Railway stations scheduled to open in 2025